Robert MacGregor McIntyre (28 November 1928 – 15 August 1962) was a Scottish motorcycle racer. He died nine days after injuries sustained racing at Oulton Park, Cheshire, England in August 1962.

Career
McIntyre was born in Scotstoun, Glasgow. He entered competition in 1948 on his only transport, an Ariel Red Hunter, and was soon competing in off-road scrambles. After a few seasons he began road racing, but the roads were not always well surfaced. McIntyre rode a BSA at Balado Airfield near Kinross. The concrete track had patches of loose gravel, and he won three of the four races he entered.

Racing at Isle of Man
For 1952 he rode a BSA to second in the Isle of Man Junior Clubmans TT, averaging  on his fastest lap. A long association with the Isle of Man Mountain Circuit had begun. Later that year McIntyre returned to win the Manx Junior (350cc) and come second in the Manx Senior (500cc) riding the same AJS 7R in both classes.

AJS rider
In 1953, following some English National short circuit wins, McIntyre went to the North West 200 for his first International win on an AJS 7R in the 350 cc class. Despite having to retire at the TT that year, his performance was noticed by AJS, and he joined that team for the 1953 Grands Prix World championship. The only win was at Pau in France, there was a third at the Ulster Grand Prix, and he was in the first six placings for the Netherlands, Switzerland and Belgium. In the 1954 Isle of Man Senior TT McIntyre came 14th on an AJS.

Potts Norton privateer
AJS pulled out of racing, and McIntyre was soon riding the 'Dustbin' faired Potts Norton, and winning. The TT looked to be within reach, and in the 1955 Isle of Man Junior TT he did lead for four of the seven laps, but brake overheating and suspension problems forced him to slow, allowing Bill Lomas on a Moto Guzzi to go on to victory, with McIntyre second. Giulio Carcano offered him a Guzzi ride after, but he did not accept.

He continued to ride the 'Dustbin' faired Norton for Joe Potts, from Bellshill near Glasgow, and continued to win races other than the TT. The 1956 TT saw retirements with mechanical problems.

Gilera and the World Championship Grand Prix
In 1957, owing to personal intervention by injured Gilera works rider Geoff Duke, McIntyre was offered a ride on the four cylinder Gileras for the Isle of Man TT. Race week began with the Junior TT. The Gileras had pannier fuel tanks built into the side of the fairings to carry extra fuel. The extra fuel weight didn't stop him from making a  first lap. He caught up to, and overtook 1956 World Champion, John Surtees who was riding an MV Agusta 500. McIntyre went on to win, after racing for three hours, two minutes and fifty-seven seconds. This was McIntyre's best TT.

The 1957 World Championship looked to be within reach, but a crash at Assen, in the Dutch TT meant he was out of action for a couple of months. He did come second in the 500 cc Ulster Grand Prix, and won the 350 cc Nations Grand Prix at Monza. His teammate Libero Liberati won the 500 cc World Championship that year, with McIntyre coming second. McIntyre was third in the 350 cc World Championship as well.

At the end of 1957 the Italian teams quit Grand Prix racing citing increasing costs. In November 1957, with racing over, McIntyre rode a 350 cc Gilera racer around the banked circuit at Monza in an attempt to break the one-hour speed record, and he averaged  on the bumpy Monza surface. This record was not bettered until 1964, by Mike Hailwood at 144.8 on an MV Agusta, on the track at Daytona.

Riding a Norton in the Senior TT he came second. He won the 1961 250cc Ulster Grand Prix. In the 1962 Isle of Man Lightweight TT, he raised the lap record to 99.61, and then retired with electrical problems. He also rode in Grand Prix races on Honda and Bianchi, making the podium in the Netherlands, Belgium, and East Germany.

In 1962 McIntyre finished second in the Spanish and French Grands Prix, while he had a non-start in the 500 Senior TT and mechanical problems in both the 250 and 350 cc events.

He went on to win the Belgium GP at the Spa-Francorchamps circuit in the Ardennes, his last victory on the World stage.

Tribute
In 2017, Michael Dunlop recreated McIntyre's achievement with a parade/demonstration on the TT course, at a similar speed with a 100-mph lap on a replica 1957 Gilera, and wearing period clothing.

Oulton Park
McIntyre still competed in non-championship events, and it was at one such event at Oulton Park, Cheshire in August 1962 that he won the 250 cc race, and then started in the 500 cc race on his Manx Norton. After a bad start in poor conditions, he fought his way to the front before aquaplaning across a stream of water, losing control and crashing into a post holding an advertising sign, sustaining serious head injuries. After nine days in hospital he died.

Results

Manx Grand Prix races

Isle of Man TT races

FIM Motor-Cycle Grand Prix races

(key) (Races in bold indicate pole position)

Sources

Further reading
 "Being There" Hugh Anderson 
 50 Years of Moto Grand Prix (1st edition). Hazelton Publishing Ltd, 1999

External links
 TT database rider profile iomtt.com
 TT database TT results iomtt.com
 List of victories

1928 births
1962 deaths
Sportspeople from Glasgow
Isle of Man TT riders
250cc World Championship riders
350cc World Championship riders
500cc World Championship riders
Motorcycle racers who died while racing
Scottish motorcycle racers
Sport deaths in England